A Girl Fighter is a 1972 Taiwanese and Hong Kong film. It was directed by Yeung Sai Hing (Yang Shih-Ching).

Cast
Polly Shang-Kwan Ling Feng
Tien Peng
Law Bun
Cho Kin
Chan Wai Lau
Miu Tin
Lui Ming
Man Chung San
Got Heung Ting
Go Ming
Chiu Ting
Chui Fook Sang
Got Siu Bo
Ricky Hui
Hung Fa Long
Seung-Goon Leung
Tse Chung Mau

References

External links
 
 
A Girl Fighter at Hong Kong Cinemagic

1972 films
Taiwanese action films
Hong Kong action films
1970s action films
1970s Mandarin-language films
1970s Hong Kong films